The 1985–86 Asian Club Championship was the fifth edition of the annual Asian club football competition hosted by the Asian Football Confederation, and was the first such tournament in 14 years. Several clubs played in the qualifying round in the fall of 1985, with he final tournament being held in Jeddah, Saudi Arabia, from 19 to 29 January 1986.

Daewoo Royals (KOR) won their first Asian Club Championship.

Qualifying Tournament

West Asia 1

Round 1

Note:  Al-Ahli Sana'a and  Al-Shorta Aden both withdrew before the draw, while the Lebanese FA did not send a team.

Round 2

 Al-Rasheed withdrew from the tournament; Al-Ittihad Aleppo advanced.

West Asia 2
Qualification from the 1985 GCC Champions League.

Participants

 Al-Muharraq
 Al-Arabi
 Fanja
 Al-Rayyan
 Al-Ahli Jeddah
 Al Ain

Final

 Al-Ahli Jeddah and Al-Arabi qualified for the final tournament, but Al-Arabi later withdrew.

Central Asia (Coca-Cola Cup)
Played in Colombo, Sri Lanka. The tournament was called the Coca-Cola Cup.

Note: East Bengal FC defender Tarun Dey was awarded the Man of the Tournament award for leading the team to five wins without conceding a single goal in the tournament.

 and  did not send a team.

Southeast Asia (ASEAN Champions Cup)
Played in Indonesia

Note:  and  did not send a team.

Playoff

East Asia 1

 Seiko qualified, but later withdrew as the club folded.

East Asia 2

 Daewoo Royals
 Wa Seng
Note:  Yomiuri withdrew before the draw.

Both legs were played in South Korea as Macau did not have an AFC or FIFA-standard stadium.

Daewoo Royals won 14-1 on aggregate and qualified.

Group stage
Note: As  Seiko withdrew from the final tournament after the club folded,  Krama Yudha Tiga Berlian, who finished first in Group 4 but lost the playoff, took their place.

Group A

Group B

Knockout stage

Semifinal

Third place match

Final

References

External links
Asian Club Competitions 1986 at RSSSF.com

1985 in Asian football
1986 in Asian football
1985–86
Asian Club Championship, 1985–86
Asian Club Championship, 1985–86
International club association football competitions hosted by Saudi Arabia